Scythris bornicensis is a moth of the family Scythrididae. It was described by Jäckh in 1977. It is found in France, Germany, Spain and  Switzerland.

The wingspan is about 15 mm. The fore- and hindwings have a clear chocolate brown, bronzy ground colour. There is no patterns on the wings.

References

bornicensis
Moths described in 1977